The Kuwait Cricket is the official governing body for the game of cricket in Kuwait.  It is an associate member of the International Cricket Council, and a full member of the Asian Cricket Council and affiliated to Kuwait Olympic Committee. The Association was founded in 1996.

History of Cricket in Kuwait
 1946:
Cricket first played in Magwa between the Oil Company employees and those of the contracting companies.
 1947:
Magwa Cricket Club formed by Kuwait Oil Company senior staff. For a brief period known as the Kuwait Cricket Club.
 1948:
Magwa Cricket Club renamed the Hubara Cricket Club; its objective was to 'Foster cricket in Kuwait'.
Alec Couttar was the first president to double up as captain.
About this time, two other clubs, The Unity and Nakhlistan Cricket Clubs, were formed consisting of junior staff of the Kuwait Oil Company.
 1951:
The Ahmadi Township was built by the Wimpey and Motherwell Bridge Companies. The cricket mad executives laid out a pitch and Hubara Club moved into the 'Oval'.
The Wimpey Trophy was inaugurated as a match between Hubara and the Contractors. This was the first trophy for cricket in Kuwait.
This was later converted into the Wimpey League which included teams from outside Ahmadi. With the construction of a thatched-board hut as pavilion, Ahmadi became the home of cricket in Kuwait.
 Doug Owen (1952) was the first to score 1000 runs in a season.

1950s:
The Magnificent Merchants. A wider circle of participation and many tournaments came into being. This spread the game within Kuwait.
 The Jashanmal Trophy between the Ahmadi, Casuals, Hawks, Combined Banks and the Rest of Kuwait.
 The Tommy Tucker Trophy between Great Britain and the Common Wealth nations.
 The Rehman Trophy between the first seven teams in the Wimpey League and Hubara.
 The Speedbird Trophy donated by BOAC was played between select Great Britain, India and Pakistan teams.
 In 1956 then New Ground was opened to accommodate the different leagues, series and playoffs.
 The Bawa Shield between Ahmadi and All Kuwait was formed.
 Characters from the Past: Alec Couttar was the first president who doubled as captain

1962:
The Kuwait Oil Company built the present Pavilion and shortly after the sight screens and score boards were erected. Managing director H L Scott declared the brand new pavilion open.
 The Napier Bowl donated by Rolls-Royce was for the match between Hubara Wanderers and Hubara Nomads.
 Bill Acton (1961) was the first to take 100 wickets in a season.

1970s:
The Rahim League was a Thursday afternoon venture and emerged as a premier partner to the Wimpey League.
 The Malhotras contributed a trophy for a league comprising the top two from Rahim and the bottom six from Wimpeys.
 The Jashanmal Trophy was renewed and the Acton-Wilson Trophy was instituted for the Under 40s versus the Over 40s.

1980s:
 Aqeel Ashraf of KIFCO set a record claiming all ten wickets in an inning against Airlines.
 Aslam Pervez of Gulf Bank scored first double century in 30 overs match of Malhotra Trophy against Kirby XI in December 1984.
 Aslam Pervez set another record of 14 sixes in 30 overs match against Kirby at Ahmadi ground in 1984.
 Evergreen became the first team after Casuals winning all 13 matches of Wimpey League.
 Ejaz Ahmed of Evergreen set a record of scoring thousand runs in thirteen matches only in Wimpey League.
 Asad Baig of Evergreen became the longest serving captain leading tenth consecutive year successfully.
 Kuwait Times hosted a Gold Trophy in March 1985 in which some international players, e.g., Abdul Qadir, Agha Zahid, Sultan Rana, Aslam Qureshi, Shahid Mahboob, Hamayun Soomar, Shehzad Ahmed, and Ali Anwar, participated for local teams and the trophy was made of TWO Kg pure Gold won by Evergreen.
 Asad Baig of Evergreen set a record of claiming five wickets in an over against Rangers at NC ground.

1990s:

The Cricketing agenda as is currently in place.
 The Classic League Premier League, Challenge League, KBRC Trophy, GC/MK Electric League, KEC League are the top leagues and the Mirza Cup is the Knock Out Tournament.
 The season is kicker off by an Invitation Six a Side and climaxes into an Indo Pak competition in February.
 The Inter School Cricket League is a regular feature.
 The Inter Group Tournament and the Three Nation Under 16 Schoolboys Tournament.
 The Hubara Veterans the Hubara Juniors (Under 18s) and the Hubara Colts (Under 14s) are now participating in various leagues. Besides a coaching clinic is held thrice weekly at Ahmadi for school boys.
 Shoaib Malik of Hubara hits Six Sixes in an over off Riffat Butt of Al Sayer in year 1995.

2000:
2001:*Gagira Perusinghe of Lanka Lions established A New World Record claiming the 9 dismissals behind the wicket of FedEx Cricket Club all 9 batsmen were 'Stumped' .
2003: Kuwait became the first after UAE by laying the two TURF Pitches in Hubara Oval and Kuwait Entertainment City grounds and converted the outfield into grass.
2006: Unity Oval ground converted into grass and laid down the new proper Turf Pitch.
 Rafat Hasan Khan of Gulf Bank holds the record for playing continuously 28th cricket season of senior's cricket in Kuwait.
 Hiasham Asad took six field catches playing for Al Babtain against Kuwait Entertainment City team in Classic League match played on Friday 1 December 2006 at Hubara Ahmadi cricket ground.

The International Flavor:
Kuwait Cricket Teams regularly visited Cyprus and travelled to England, Switzerland, India, Pakistan besides other Gulf Countries.
 1969: Tom Graveney's XI visited Kuwait with Clive Lloyd, Basil D'Oliveira, Freddie Truman, Glen Turner, Godfrey Evans.
The EMU Club from Australia played in Kuwait.
 1971: Norman Gifford's XI with Ken Wadsworth, Neil Hawke, Bob Cunis among others.
 1977: Air India XI visit Kuwait with Mohinder Amarnath, Sudinder Amarnath among others.
 1979: Younis Ahmed XI visits Kuwait with Imran Khan, Zaheer Abbas, Asif Iqbal, Sarfraz Nawaz, Saeed Ahmed, Younis Ahmed, Wasim Bari, Chander Shaikar and Persanna.
 1980: Kuwait Wanderers Tour England and win the Rothman's Cup competing against Australia, England, Kenya and Holland.
 1984: Habib Bank Team visits Kuwait with Javed Miandad, Mohsin Khan, Salim Malik and Abdul Qadir amongst others.
 1986: Pakistan vs World XI with Abdul Qadir, Ramiz Raja, Imran Khan, Wasim Akram, Arjuna Ranatunga, Ian Botham, Graham Rope & Martin Crows.
 1995: Indian team played against Pakistan in Kuwait with Azharuddin, Sachin Tandulkar, Ravi Shastri, Sunil Gavaskar, Ramiz Raja, Salim Malik, Wasim Akram, Aaqib Javed
 1998: Pakistan Visits Kuwait with Inzamam ul Haq, Shahid Afridi, Azhar Mahmood, Moin Khan, Mansoor Akhtar and Mohammed Sami.
 1998: Kuwait National Team led by a Kuwaiti Citizen Faisal Al Marzouq visits Pakistan and wins four of ten matches, surprising all critics.
 1999: Salmiya batsman Mohammed Nawaz became the first batsman to hit a century for the Kuwait national team, against the Rawalpindi District Cricket Association.
 2000: Pakistan Under 19 team Visits Kuwait with Hasan Raza, Mohammed Sami among others.
 Kuwait Under 17 Participated in ICC U17 Asia Cup in Karachi. Pakistan.
 Kuwait Senior National team Participated in ACC Trophy 2000 in UAE.
 Mohammed Nawaz finishes the ACC Trophy 2000 with 185 runs and Kuwait's top scorer.
 2001: Kuwait Under 19 Participated in Youth Asia Cup in Kathmandu Nepal.
 Kuwait Under 17 Participated in ACC U17 Asia Cup in Dacca Bangladesh.
 Kuwait hosted first ever ICC under 13 Gulf Cup Kuwait team. Pratheesh Rajpal led them to the cup.
 2002: Pakistan Visits Kuwait with Rashid Latif, Shahid Afridi, Azhar Mahmood, Younis Khan, Saeed Anwar, Yousuf Youhanna, Mohammed Sami, Faisal Iqbal, Imran Nazir & Danish Kanaria. Faisal Al Marzouq  led the Kuwait national team. 
 Kuwait Senior National team led by Faisal Al Marzouq Participated in ACC Trophy 2002 in Singapore.
 Kuwait U15 Team participated in ACC U15 Trophy held in UAE.
 2003: Kuwait Hosted first ever Gulf Cup and won the trophy, under the captaincy of Faisal Al Marzouq 
 Kuwait Under 19 Participated in Youth Asia Cup in Karachi Pakistan.
 Kuwait Under 17 Participated in ACC U17 Gulf Cup in Doha Qatar.
 2004: Kuwait Senior National team Participated in ACC Trophy 2004 in Kuala Lumpur Malaysia. Raffat Khan led the Kuwait national team
 Kuwait U15 Team participated in ACC U15 Trophy held in UAE.
 Kuwait U17 Team participated in ACC U17 Asia Cup held in India.
 2005: Kuwait Senior National team Participated in WCQS Div.2 held in Kuala Lumpur, Malaysia. * Kuwait under 19 team Participated in ACC U19 Trophy in Kathmandu Nepal.
 Kuwait Hosted second Gulf Cup and Oman won the championship.
 Kuwait U17 Team participated in ACC U17 Trophy held in Kuala Lumpur Malaysia.
 2006: Kuwait hosted First Middle East Cup and Bahrain won the championship.
 Kuwait U15 Team participated in ACC U15 Cup (Elite Division) held in Kuala Lumpur Malaysia.
 Kuwait Senior National team Participated in ACC Trophy 2006 held in Kuala Lumpur, Malaysia
 2007:.
 Kuwait U19 Team participated in ACC U19 Cup (Elite Division) held in Kuala Lumpur Malaysia.
 Kuwait is gearing up to host the first ever ACC Twenty 20 cup in which top ten ranking non-test playing countries will participate scheduled 25 October until 2 November 2007 .

Recognition by International Associations

1996: Formation of the Kuwait Cricket Association
1997: Kuwait Olympic Committee
1998: International Cricket Council as Affiliate member
1998: Asian Cricket Council as Associate member
2005: ICC as Associate member
2006: ACC as Full member

References

External links
 Official website
 KuwaitiCricket.com (archived in 2008)

Kuwait
Cricket
Cricket in Kuwait
Sports organizations established in 1996